Fronton (Languedocien: Frontonh) is a commune in the Haute-Garonne department in southwestern France.

It lies 28 km north of Toulouse and within its metropolitan area.

Population

Wine
It is the centre of one of the oldest wine regions in France, producing the AOC Côtes du Frontonnais, based (50%) on the local négrette grape (known as Pinot Saint-George in the United States) plus some or other of Syrah, Côt, cabernet franc, Cabernet sauvignon, fer servadou, gamay, cinsaut and mauzac.

See also
Communes of the Haute-Garonne department

References

Communes of Haute-Garonne